Cape Valavielle is a cape marking the north end of Watson Peninsula on the north coast of Laurie Island, in the South Orkney Islands.

Charted and named by the French expedition, 1837–40, under Captain Jules Dumont d'Urville.
 

Laurie Island
Headlands of the South Orkney Islands